Valeriy Pylypovych Borzov (born 20 October 1949) is a former Soviet sprinter. He is a two-time Olympian, a former president of the National Olympic Committee of Ukraine, and Minister for Youth and Sports of Ukraine.

In 1972 he won the 100 and 200 metres sprint events at the Olympic Games in Munich.

Career
Born in Sambor, Drogobychskaya Oblast, Ukrainian SSR, Soviet Union, Borzov started his track and field career in 1968. He became a household name in the Track and Field circles after having won the sprint-double at the 1971 European Championships in Helsinki. He had already won the 100 m championship in 1969, when he equalled Armin Hary's nine-year-old European record of 10.0 seconds.

At the 1972 Munich Olympics, two American favourites and world record holders, Eddie Hart and Rey Robinson, missed the 100 m quarterfinals due to a misunderstanding about the starting time of the heats. Coincidentally Borzov almost missed his own quarter-final as well, having fallen asleep in the stadium, his coach waking him up just as the race was about to start. Borzov won the 100 m sprint with relative ease in a time of 10.14 seconds. Borzov then won the 200 m in great style. The picture, featuring Borzov winning the 200 m heats at the 1972 Summer Olympics was selected for the Voyager Golden Record and later launched into space aboard two Voyager spacecraft in 1977. He also won silver as part of the Soviet 4 × 100 relay team, leaving Munich with three medals and the title of the fastest human in the world.

Between the 1972 and the 1976 Olympics, Borzov spent more time on his studies and soccer. Still, this did not stop him from winning his third successive 100 m title at the European Championships in 1974. At the 1976 Montreal Olympics, he finished third in the 100 m race behind Caribbean sprinters Hasley Crawford and Donald Quarrie, in a time of 10.14, his fourth Olympic medal. In the 4 × 100 m relay, his team won another bronze.

A persisting injury forced Borzov to abandon his hopes to participate in his third Olympic Games. He ended his career in 1979. He married Ludmilla Tourischeva, a four-time Olympic champion in gymnastics, in 1977.

Political career
Borzov's political career started during the 1970s as a member of the Communist Youth League of the Ukrainian SSR. In 1980–1986 he was one of the secretaries of the Central Committee of the  Komsomol of the Ukrainian SSR. From 1991 to 1998, Borzov  served as the president of the Ukrainian Olympic Committee. He has been a member of the International Olympic Committee since 1994. He has also held a Youth and Sports cabinet minister position with the Government of Ukraine from 1990 till 1997. From 1998 until 2006, he was a member of the Ukrainian parliament. 

Soon after being elected to the party list for People's Movement of Ukraine (Rukh) in 1998 he changed from the Rukh faction to the faction "Reforms Center" in 1998–1999. Yet after dissolution of the parliamentary faction of Hromada, in 1999 Borzov became one of the first who joined the newly created parliamentary faction Batkivshchyna (today known as All-Ukrainian Union "Fatherland") in Verkhovna Rada, with which he stayed almost to the end of the third parliamentary convocation. In 2001, Borzov joined the Social Democratic Party of Ukraine (united). He stayed with the same party for the next elections in 2002, and eventually became a member in 2003.

Gallery

Bibliography

References

1949 births
Living people
People from Sambir
People from Drohobych Oblast
Soviet male sprinters
Dynamo sports society athletes
Olympic athletes of the Soviet Union
Athletes (track and field) at the 1972 Summer Olympics
Athletes (track and field) at the 1976 Summer Olympics
International Olympic Committee members
Olympic gold medalists for the Soviet Union
Olympic silver medalists for the Soviet Union
Olympic bronze medalists for the Soviet Union
Burevestnik (sports society) athletes
Chevaliers of the Order of Merit (Ukraine)
Komsomol of Ukraine members
Third convocation members of the Verkhovna Rada
Fourth convocation members of the Verkhovna Rada
People's Movement of Ukraine politicians
Social Democratic Party of Ukraine (united) politicians
European Athletics Championships medalists
Honoured Masters of Sport of the USSR
Recipients of the Order of Friendship of Peoples
Recipients of the Order of Lenin
Youth and sport ministers of Ukraine
Ukrainian State Committee chairmen of Youth, Physical Culture and Sport
Presidents of the National Olympic Committee of Ukraine
Medalists at the 1976 Summer Olympics
Medalists at the 1972 Summer Olympics
Olympic gold medalists in athletics (track and field)
Olympic silver medalists in athletics (track and field)
Olympic bronze medalists in athletics (track and field)
Recipients of the Order of Danylo Halytsky
Recipients of the Honorary Diploma of the Cabinet of Ministers of Ukraine